Sham Shui Po Sports Association are a Hong Kong professional football club based in Sham Shui Po District which currently competes in the Hong Kong Premier League.

History
In the 2011–12 season, the club was promoted to the top-tier Hong Kong First Division for the first time in the club's history, but was relegated after finishing bottom out of 10 teams.

In July 2022, Sham Shui Po accepted HKFA's invitation to be promoted to the 2022–23 Hong Kong Premier League.

Team staff
{|class="wikitable"
|-
!Position
!Staff
|-
|Director of Football||  Ko Chun Kay
|-
|Head coach||  Kwok Kar Lok
|-
|Assistant coach||  Tang Kwun Yin
|-
|Fitness coach||  Lai Pui Yik
|-
|Goalkeeping coach||  Poon Kwong Tak

Current squad

First team

 LP

 FP

 FP

 FP
 FP

 FP

 (on loan from Eastern)
 FP

 FP

 FP

Remarks:
LP These players are registered as local players in Hong Kong domestic football competitions.
FP These players are registered as foreign players.

Retired numbers

Honours

League
 Hong Kong Second Division
Champions (1): 2010–11
Runners-up (1): 2018–19
 Hong Kong Third Division
Champions (1): 2009–10
 Hong Kong Third Division District League
Champions (1): 2009–10

Head coaches
 Fung Hoi Man (2002–2003)
 Lee Chi Kin (2008–2012)
 Ko Chun Kay (2015–2022)
 Poon Man Tik (2022)
 Kwok Kar Lok (2022–)

References

External links
 Sham Shui Po at HKFA

 
Football clubs in Hong Kong
Hong Kong First Division League
Hong Kong Premier League
Sham Shui Po District
2002 establishments in Hong Kong